JKS 1909 Jarosław is a Polish football club based in Jarosław. They currently play in IV liga, the fifth tier of the Polish football league.

History 
JKS Jarosław was officially formed in 1909 as Pogoń Jarosław, and entered the Eastern Galicia league several years later. After World War I the club changed its name to JKS Jarosłavia. In 1938, JKS Jarosłavia was changed to JKS Jarosław. On 25 May 1947, the new stadium was opened. To celebrate the opening of the stadium, JKS Jarosław played a friendly against Wisła Kraków, and Polonia Przemyśl. In 1962, JKS Jarosław played in the third tier of the Polish football league system, and achieved a club record highest league finish of second position.

References

External links 

Football clubs in Poland
Association football clubs established in 1909
Football clubs in Podkarpackie Voivodeship
1909 establishments in Poland